e-Rozgaar Progam is flagship project of Youth Affairs & Sports Department, Government of Punjab and Punjab Information Technology Board (PITB) which provides training to young graduates of Punjab province in digital skills and freelancing. e-Rozgaar Program offers courses like Technical (programming and tech), Content Marketing & Advertising, Creative Designing, E-Commerce, Mobile App Development, Digital & Social Media Marketing, and UI/UX Design while freelancing is taught will all courses.

History 
e-Rozgaar Training Program was inaugurated by Chief Minister Punjab, Shahbaz Sharif on March 28, 2017. As stated by Chairman PITB Umar Saif during launch, 40 training centers in 36 districts of Punjab will be established for the purpose to produce 10,000 freelancers per month to increase the foreign remittances in Pakistan under this project

See also 

 National Freelance Training Program (NFTP)

References

External links 

 Official website: www.erozgaar.pitb.gov.pk

Educational institutions in Pakistan
Distance education institutions based in Pakistan